Saptur is a village in Madurai district, Tamil Nadu, India.

History
Saptur, traditionally recognised as one of the 72 palaiyams of Madura, was situated about 15 km from T.Kallupatti. It was part of Tirunelveli and was transferred in 1859 to Madura District (present day Madurai district).

Saptur is derived from two Telugu words, sapa (mat) and oota (spring).

Geography
Saptur is located on the foothills of the Western Ghats and is in Peraiyur taluk.

Demographics
At the 2011 Census of India, Saptur was the largest village in Madurai district by area, being . It then had a population of 7170.

References

Villages in Madurai district